Frederick William Backus Coleman (1874–1947) was a non-career appointee who served as the American Envoy Extraordinary and Minister Plenipotentiary to Denmark from 1931 to 1933.  He also served concurrent appointments as Envoy Extraordinary and Minister Plenipotentiary to Latvia, Estonia and Lithuania from 1922 until 1931.  He was the first U.S. Envoy Extraordinary and Minister Plenipotentiary to the Baltic States.

Coleman graduated from the University of Michigan with a bachelor's degree and a law degree.  When he was 66, he graduated with a degree in library science from the University of North Carolina.

References

1874 births
1947 deaths
Ambassadors of the United States to Denmark
Ambassadors of the United States to Latvia
Ambassadors of the United States to Estonia
Ambassadors of the United States to Lithuania
University of Michigan Law School alumni
University of North Carolina alumni